Scottsdale, formerly known as Ellesmere, is a town in the north-east of Tasmania, Australia. It is part of the Dorset Council.

History
The area was first surveyed in 1855 and was described as, "the best soil on the island ... well watered, with a mild climate" by the surveyor James Reid Scott, for whom the town is named. This rings true today as the town, as well as being the regional centre for other north-east towns, is a major agricultural centre.

The first land was selected in 1859 and the hamlet of Ellesmere grew up. Ellesmere Post Office opened on 29 November 1865, and was renamed Scottsdale in 1893.

Industry
Potato farming, dairy farming, pine plantations, poppy cultivation and mining are all major industries in the area. Hops were previously an important crop, however large hop farms have over the last few years been sold and/or turned into dairy farms and eucalypt and pine plantations.

The setting of the town, surrounded by green fields and blue mountains, as well as increasing infrastructure and improved promotion for visitors, is giving the local tourism industry a boost. The Barnbougle Dunes and Lost Farm Golf Links and the Bridestowe Estate Lavender Farm are key local attractions.

Since 1958 Scottsdale has been the location of the Defence Nutrition Research Centre and its predecessor laboratories and production facilities.  In 2014 these were redeveloped by the Defence Science and Technology Organisation (DSTO).

The Forest EcoCentre, operated by Forestry Tasmania, was built in Scottsdale in the late 1990s, as an educational visitor centre designed to inform the public about the forestry industry in Tasmania. The Visitor Centre has since closed.

Scottsdale is an important service centre for north-east Tasmania, with shops catering for most residents' needs, however the town's retail sector is suffering, with increasing vacancies in the town's main street of King Street.

The town has also suffered from the closure of the North-East Tasmania Rail Line, which increased the number of trucks on local roads. 
The rails were removed from the section between Scottsdale and Herrick and were used for the Abt Wilderness Railway on Tasmania's west coast, despite local attempts to run a tourist railway. The local Rotary Club has now developed part of this section of old railway line as a bike trail through to near Legerwood. 
The remaining line Scottsdale to Coldwater Creek, north of Launceston is sitting unused with both bike rail trail and tourist railway proposals in place, with a decision not likely to be made soon.

Climate
Scottsdale has a mild climate with warm summers and cool, wet winters. Extremes have ranged from 37.7 °C (99.9 °F) to -4.7 °C (23.5 °F). The average annual rainfall is 987.1 mm (38.8 in)

Demographics
Scottsdale is a relatively Anglo-Saxon community, with the largest groups of foreign-born locals being from the United Kingdom, New Zealand and Italy. 72% of the population identifies as Christian. The median age of the town is 36. (Figures from the 2001 census)

In Scottsdale the median weekly individual income for persons aged 15 years and over who were usual residents was $362, compared with $466 in Australia. The median weekly household income was $697, compared with $1,027 in Australia. The median weekly family income was $936, compared with $1,171 in Australia.

Scottsdale voters showed their conservatism compared to other Tasmanian towns when they gave the Liberal candidate at the 2004 Federal election, Michael Ferguson, 61.72% of their vote on a two-party preferred basis. In the 2007 election, Ferguson managed a slightly smaller majority of 59.97%.

Localities
Scottsdale consists of a web of streets around two major avenues, King Street (Tasman Highway) and George Street/Tasman Highway or "Ringarooma Road" (Bridport Road). The main shopping area is located around King Street and Victoria Street.

The high point of the town is located in Scott St where there is a large water storage tank.

Ellesmere is the original Scottsdale where the first settlement was built, located now on the northern outskirts of the town.

Public facilities in the town include an outdoor swimming pool, sports stadium, golf course, public library (including an online access centre), primary school and high school.

Northeast Park is a popular facility in the town, and provides seven days free camping, barbecues and coin-operated hot showers for those passing through the region. Northeast Park has had recent upgrades, with community support helping to improve the park.

Public Transport in the region is serviced by RD & FH Sainty North East Bus Service. The service runs several times per day delivering passengers and freight to local businesses. Also there is an early service primarily for students studying in Launceston leaving at 7:10 am and returning at 5:20 pm every school day.

Culture

In July 2006 Scottsdale, the heart of Tasmania's "north-east Bible belt", was given national coverage because local Exclusive Brethren members were named as having conducted an advertising smear against the Australian Greens political party.

There has been consternation and division in 2005 and 2006 in the local community and against the Dorset Council over the issue of the closure of William Street to through traffic and the blessing of Lilydale Road and Listers Lane as a trucking route. A new "version" of Listers Lane was built to link Lilydale Road to Bridport Road. Many local businesses protested against the closure of William Street, and today the new road sits unused because of safety reasons, a "white elephant" costing several million dollars. The road reopened in 2008.

Major activity is currently afoot around Scottsdale in the development of the tourist trail, "Trail of the Tin Dragon".

Scottsdale locals gain a sense of community by participating in activities related to the local primary and high schools, churches and sport. Australian rules football is very popular in the town and the Scottsdale Football Club had success in the Northern Tasmanian Football Association. Also popular are swimming, golf, hockey, bowls and basketball.

Students wishing to complete their Tasmanian Certificate of Education (TCE) are required to attend college in the city of Launceston.

Scottsdale is served by television stations ABC TV, SBS, Southern Cross Tasmania, WIN Television, TDT and radio stations 7SD 540 kHz and Sea FM 99.7 MHz, and Launceston newspaper The Examiner and local newspaper The North-East Advertiser.

7SD previously operated from studios in Scottsdale's King Street. It provided a community service by joining together locals over the large north-east Tasmania area by for example publishing cooking books filled with recipes by locals. There are no longer local radio broadcasts from Scottsdale itself. 7SD and SeaFM are both now retransmitted from Launceston with Sea FM becoming Chilli North East a retranslated version of 90.1 Chilli FM, 540 7SD is a retranslated version of 89.3 LAFM.

References

External links

 RD & FH Sainty North East Bus Service
 Forest EcoCentre  Forestry Tasmania Information centre
 Link to satellite image of Scottsdale on GoogleMaps
 Climate Statistics for Scottsdale
 Radio 7SD 540 AM Scottsdale

North East Tasmania
Localities of Dorset Council (Australia)